Gum Springs is a community in Fairfax County in Hybla Valley along Route 1 (Richmond Highway). The African American community, the oldest in the county, was established in 1833 by West Ford, a freedman who had been manumitted by Hannah Bushrod Washington (widow of John Augustine Washington), in 1805. A historical marker (Number E-04) was erected by the Virginia Department of Historic Resources in 1991.

History

Founding
In 1833, Gum Springs was founded by West Ford, a freed slave, skilled carpenter, and manager on George Washington's plantation, Mount Vernon. Ford was able to develop this 214-acre farming community from the sale of land he inherited from Hannah Washington, the sister-in-law of George Washington. By 1866, Ford was the second richest free black farmer in Fairfax County, Virginia. Gum Springs Farm became the nucleus of an African-American community throughout the 1800s.

Gum Springs School 
The school was established after the Civil War.

Bethlehem Baptist Church 

The church was established in 1863.

Odd Fellows Hall 
The Pride of Fairfax Lodge #298, former Odd Fellows Hall. is eligible for the National Register of Historic Places.

Joint Stock Club 
In 1890, the Joint Stock Club was formed by five men. This endeavor helped create a safe place for African Americans to obtain land.  All land was collaboratively bought, sold and subdivided at cost to other African Americans at a price of $30 an acre.

Snowden Cemetery

Woodland Baptist Church

Gum Springs Historical Society and Museum
Gum Springs Historical Society and Museum is dedicated to preserving the legacy of Gum Springs Community and regularly disseminates information that tells the story of the Community's economic struggle and dedication to building an African-American community. A historical marker is located at the corner of Richmond Highway and Fordson Road ( 38° 44.909′ N, 77° 4.965′ W).

Notable people 

West Ford
Saunders B. Moon 
Annie M. (Dandridge) Smith
Reverend Samuel K. Taylor

References

Further reading 

Unincorporated communities in Fairfax County, Virginia
Unincorporated communities in Virginia
African-American history of Virginia
Populated places established in 1833
1833 establishments in Virginia